The 1902 Oregon Agricultural Aggies football team represented Oregon Agricultural College (now known as Oregon State University) as an independent during the 1902 college football season. In their first and only season under head coach Fred Herbold, the Aggies compiled a 4–1–1 record and outscored their opponents by a combined total of 157 to 16. The Aggies defeated Willamette (two games, 67–0 and 21–0), McMinnville College (33–0), and Pacific University (31–0), lost to Washington (5–16), and tied with Oregon (0–0). John Gault was the team captain.

Schedule

References

Oregon Agricultural
Oregon State Beavers football seasons
Oregon Agricultural Aggies football